Perdizes may refer to:

Perdizes (district of São Paulo)
Perdizes, Minas Gerais